Azusa Pacific University has graduated several notable alumni, including actors, athletes, entertainers, Olympians, and prominent pastors.

References

Azusa Pacific University people
Azusa Pacific University people